R. Sreekandan Nair is an Indian television actor, veteran journalist and Managing Director of Flowers TV and 24 News. He has hosted several Malayalam TV shows, including Oru Nimisham, Nammal Thammil, Janata Ki Adalath, and Samadooram. He was formerly a presenter on Doordarshan, the content head and senior Vice President of Asianet in the Kerala sector of India, and a consultant to the entertainment television operations of Mazhavil Manorama. He has hosted a talk show called the 'Sreekandan Nair Show' on Flowers TV in which he achieved Guinness world record along with Flowers TV for hosting a TV talk-show for 6 hours and asked 674 questions on 18 March 2018.

Career
In 1984, Sreekandan Nair started his career as a programme executive at All India Radio. There, he penned and staged over 1500 satirical radio plays, radio dramas, and documentaries. He also anchored the program Oru Nimisham on Doordarshan.He wrote a screenplay for malayalam movie Raajathanthram

He later joined Asianet as the head of its TV content division in Kerala. While working there, he launched the Malayalam television talk show Nammal Thammil, which spanned 750 episodes over 17 years. He eventually became the Show Director of the event management division of Asianet. In 2003, he became the Senior Vice president of Asianet. He simultaneously worked for Mazhavil Manorama as a consultant and founded the company Magic Media Infotainment Private Limited. Under its banner, he produced and anchored the talk show Samadooram and the television serial Kathayile Rajakumari, which was broadcast on Mazhavil Manorama.

On 4 January 2016, he launched a talk show called the Sreekandan Nair Show on Flowers TV, of which he is the managing director. He later launched another talk show called 'Oru Nimisham' on the same channel.

Sreekandan Nair launched a show called Flowers Oru Kodi, which allows participants to win 1 crore through a quiz session. The show is live since 2022.

Films
 Raajathanthram (1997) (Story, Screenplay, dialogue)
Njangal Santhushtaranu as Sreekandan Nair

References

External links
 Sreekantan Nair to Break Guinness World Record
 Sreekantan Nair achieves Guinness World Record, Times of India

Living people
Businesspeople from Kollam
Indian television presenters
Year of birth missing (living people)